Arborway station was an MBTA light rail stop and bus transfer location in Boston, Massachusetts. It served the MBTA Green Line E branch. It was located in Arborway Yard near the Forest Hills station complex. It closed in 1985 when the outer section of the branch was temporarily—and ultimately permanently—closed.

History

On December 12, 1895, the West End Street Railway opened its Forest Hills Yard with a 12-track carhouse on the east side of Washington Street, serving newly electrified streetcar lines. The Boston Elevated Railway (BERy), successor to the West End, opened a second carhouse on the site two years later. In 1913, the BERy opened a ramp from the Washington Street Elevated into a small yard inside the complex. The ramp was disused after six months, and was removed in 1922.

On March 1, 1924, the BERy opened a streetcar transfer station inside the yard to relieve crowding at Forest Hills station. The Jamaica Plain via South Huntington line was soon extended to Arborway, improving connections with the other lines. The BERy replaced the older carhouses with a new six-track carhouse and a bus garage in 1924–25. Buses gradually replaced streetcars; all of the Arborway-terminating lines except the South Huntington line (Arborway Line, later Green Line E branch) were converted to bus by 1956. In 1962, the MTA opened its headquarters building at 500 Arborway.

Arborway closed on December 28, 1985 when the line was "temporarily" suspended and ultimately closed. When the new Forest Hills station was opened in 1987, a loop for the E branch was included as part of the station complex, so that Arborway would only be used for layovers and maintenance. No streetcar ever used the station, which was instead later used for route 39 buses from 2000 to 2017. The loop and the waiting area were removed in 2017 as part of the Casey Overpass replacement. The Arborway carhouse remained until 2001 when it was demolished and replaced by a smaller facility for CNG-powered buses.

The MBTA plans to construct a 200-bus garage on the eastern portion of the site where the largely-disused 500 Arborway building is located. The garage, to be completed in 2027, will allow for electrification and expansion of the existing fleet. The western portion of the site would be used for mixed-use development.

References

External links

Green Line (MBTA) stations
Railway stations in Boston
Former MBTA stations in Massachusetts
1985 disestablishments in Massachusetts
Railway stations closed in 1985